Calliphon (or Callipho) was a Greek philosopher, who probably belonged to the Peripatetic school and lived in the 2nd century . He is mentioned several times and condemned by Cicero as making the chief good of man to consist in a union of virtue and bodily pleasure, or, as Cicero says, in the union of the human with the beast.

Notes

2nd-century BC Greek people
2nd-century BC philosophers

Peripatetic philosophers